Tamaz Somkhishvili (Russian: Тамаз Сомхишвили; June 22, 1957, Tbilisi, Georgian SSR) is a Georgian and Russian businessman. In 1990s, he was the general director of the Russian companies Lukoil, Lukoil Markets and Rosneftexport. Somkhishvili is also a part of Pandora Papers invetigation.

Early years and education 
Tamaz Somkhishvili was born on June 22, 1957 in Georgia. In 1984, he graduated from the Tobolsk Pedagogical Institute, Faculty of Physics and Mathematics, and in 1994 from Tyumen State University, Faculty of Finance and Credit.

In 1992–1993, he was the founder and CEO of Lukoil (Tyumen, Russian Federation).

In 1993–1999, he was the founder and commercial director of Lukoil Markets (Moscow, RF).

From 1995 to 2008, together with Lukoil and Rosneft, he was the founder-partner and general director of OJSC Rosneftexport (Moscow, Russia). Founder-partner since 1995 (co-founders of Lukoil and Rosneft).

Since 1998, he has been one of the founders of the Lukoil Tennis Club.

In 2001-2005, he was the founder and head of the representative office in Moscow of Danao Engineering, specializing in the extraction and processing of both raw materials and waste.

From 2002 to 2004, he was a shareholder of OAO Tomskaya Neft, a pipeline construction and field management company. In 2002-2008, he was a member of the board of Agroco, LLC Agricultural Investment Company.

In 2015, Tamaz Somkhishvili founded TS Holding.

In 2017, he was elected President of the Georgian Shooting Federation. He was the only candidate who applied for this post.

Alleged connection with crime 
According to Comments.ua Tamaz Somkhishvili was first associated with one of the main thieves in law — Ded Khasan (aka Aslan Usoyan), and after his death - with his heir Shakro Molodoy (aka Zakhary Kalashov). According to Comments.ua it is the interests of the latter in Georgia and Ukraine that Somkhishvili represents. In 2005, Spanish special services detained Shakro Molodoy. For money laundering, the court sent him to prison for 7.5 years. At that time, according to Comments.ua, Tamaz Somkhishvili managed the entire business of Shakro.

Scandal in Ukraine 
In Ukraine, Tamaz Somkhishvili became known as the beneficiary of a scheme that has not yet been implemented to receive about $98.5 million from the budget of Kyiv as compensation for losses incurred as a result of the termination of the Kyiv City State Administration of the investment agreement for the reconstruction of Kharkivska Square.

Tamaz Somkhishvili is the beneficiary of Kyiv Terminal LLC. In 2007, during his tenure as mayor of Kyiv Leonid Chernovetskyi, the company won a competition for the reconstruction of Kharkivska Square in Kyiv. However, no work has been carried out.

According to the ex-deputy chief architect of Kyiv, Viktor Gleba, there were no accounting, legal documents and decisions between the Kyiv Terminal company, the Kyiv City Council and the Kyiv City State Administration.

In 2008, Tamaz Somkhishvili's company won a lawsuit for the right to lease land. However, no work has been recorded on it. In 2013, by mutual agreement of the parties, the investment agreement was terminated.

At the end of 2018, when the statute of limitations for appealing against this decision expired, the Kyiv Terminal company filed a lawsuit against the Kyiv authorities with the Kyiv Economic Court. The plaintiff sought $25 million in damages and $75 million in lost profits. In 2019, the Commercial Court of the city of Kyiv partially satisfied the requirements, ruling to recover jointly and severally from the Department of Economics and Investments of the Kyiv City State Administration, directly from the Kyiv City State Administration and the Kyiv City Council, funds in the amount of $24.46 million (671.56 million hryvnias at the time of filing the lawsuit) in favor of LLC Kyiv Terminal.

On May 27, 2021, the Northern Court of Appeal completely dismissed the claim, ruling to recover more than UAH 1 million court fee from Somkhishvili's company. But on October 13, 2021, the Supreme Court, returned the case back to the court of appeal.

On November 18, 2021, Tamaz Somkhishvili sent a proposal to the Cabinet of Ministers to “peacefully resolve the investment dispute on damages” in accordance with the Agreement between the Government of Ukraine and the Government of the United Kingdom of Great Britain and Northern Ireland on the promotion and mutual protection of investments. In addition, Somkhishvili wrote an open letter to the President of Ukraine with the same proposals. In these addresses, Tamaz Tobolsky called himself a "British investor".

In addition, Tamaz Somkhishvili was accused of organizing a similar scheme in Odesa. According to an investigation by Serhiy Ivanov in Censor, Somkhishvili and people close to Odesa Mayor Gennadiy Trukhanov withdrew the land belonging to the city's hippodrome from state ownership, and then sold the land for $11 million to local developer Adnan Kivan, who built a residential complex on the seized land. Somkhishvili was a direct beneficiary of the Vostok-XXI company through which the transaction was carried out.

Cooperation with the Ministry of Defense of the Russian Federation 
The Ukrainian edition of Dzerkalo Tyzhnia published an investigation by journalist Sergiy Ivanov that Tamaz Somkhishvili's company is a contractor of the Russian Ministry of Defense and fulfills its orders for the repair of Russian army combat aircraft. As reported, Tamaz Somkhishvili's TS Holding is affiliated with TAM Management. TAM Management is a private company that controls the Tbilisi Aviation Plant - Joint Stock Company Tbilaviamsheni, which has been manufacturing and repairing military aircraft since the Soviet era. Tamaz Somkhishvili's son, Giorgi, is a member of the plant's board. The plant has a representative office in Moscow and is a co-founder of LLC NPK Shturmoviki Sukhoi, which repairs SU fighters and attack aircraft for the Russian army. NPK Sukhoi's Shturmoviky Sukhoi LLC has 11 government contracts for the repair of aircraft in Russia and wins most of the tenders. The main customer of NPK Sukhoi's Stormtroopers LLC is the Russian state-owned enterprise 121 Aviation Repair Plant, which is the flagship of Russian military aircraft repair and is engaged in the modernization of Su and MiG fighters, one of the main striking forces of the Russian army in the war against Ukraine. In addition, Sergiyi Ivanov published the Russian passports of Tamaz and Giorgi Somkhishvili, as well as documents from the Russian Federal Migration Service, which showed that he had registered in Moscow in 2018 and 2021, and lived there in his own home in the Family House residential complex. Following the investigation, Sergiy Ivanov appealed to the SBU, the Prosecutor General's Office, the Verkhovna Rada, the Cabinet of Ministers, and the NBU to resolve the issue of initiating NSDC sanctions against Tamaz "Tobolskii" Somkhishvili.

On January 25, 2023, the Georgian 1st TV channel posted an investigation of the project "Saturday Night" which was adapted by the Ukrainian journalist and author of the program "Antipodes' Serhiy Ivanov. The journalists found out that Tamaz Somkhishvili has an influence on the Tbilisi aviation plant (Tbilaviamsheni) and TAM Management company, which is located on the territory of the plant and operates on its capacities. According to the former director of the plant, Vazhi Tordia, who later became a co-owner and director of TAM Management, Tbilaviashmeni owns 20 percent of the Russian concern, Sukhoi Sturmoviks. This company is engaged in the repair of Russian aircraft. A relative of Tamaz Somkhishvili, Georgy is a board member and chairman of the supervisory board of Tbilisi Aircraft Plant.

According to Vazha Tordia, TAM Management was founded in 2015 by him and Tamaz Somkhishvili (who owns 50% of the shares) with the support of former Georgian Prime Minister and pro-Russian politician Bidzina Ivanishvili.

Georgian journalists also speculate that in addition to repairing and modernizing military aircraft, the Tbilisi plant is involved in modernizing Russian air-to-air missiles.

References 

1953 births
Living people